Hirokōji Station may refer to:

 Hirokōji Station (Mie), a railway station in Iga, Mie Prefecture, Japan
 Hirokōji Station (Toyama), a city tram station in Takaoka, Toyama Prefecture, Japan